Meridolum is a genus of air-breathing land snails, terrestrial pulmonate gastropod mollusks in the family Camaenidae.

Species 
Species within the genus Meridolum include:
 Meridolum benneti Brazier, 1872
 Meridolum corneovirens (Pfeiffer, 1851)
 Meridolum depressum Hedley, 1901
 Meridolum gulosum Gould, 1846
 Meridolum marshalli McLauchlan, 1951
 Meridolum middenense McLauchlan, 1954

References

Further reading 
 Clark S. A. (2009). "A review of the land snail genus Meridolum (Gastropoda: Camaenidae)  from central New South Wales, Australia". Molluscan Research 29(2): 61-120. abstract.

 
Camaenidae
Taxonomy articles created by Polbot